All Songs Considered is a weekly online multimedia program started in January 2000 by NPR's All Things Considered director Bob Boilen. At first, the show featured information and streaming audio about the songs used as bumper music on All Things Considered. The program has turned into a source of discovery for new music of all genres. In August 2005, the program began podcasting for free. In 2005, it began webcasting and podcasting live concerts from Washington, D.C.'s 9:30 Club, including acts such as Animal Collective, The Decemberists, Neko Case, and Tom Waits.

Boilen and producer/co-host Robin Hilton write a blog where they introduce music from unsigned and unknown bands and solicit ideas for shows from listeners. There was an online music channel, "All Songs 24/7", which used to stream music from the program's archive, however this was discontinued in March 2019.

In 2007, All Songs Considered became the cornerstone program of NPR Music, the music discovery web site from National Public Radio. Some NPR stations also directly broadcast the program on terrestrial radio.

All Songs Considered is also the spiritual and physical home of Tiny Desk Concerts, as the concert series is recorded live at the office desk of All Songs Considered host Bob Boilen.

All Songs Considered was a nominee for the 2002 Webby Awards in the "Websites and Mobile Sites" category.

See also 
Music podcast

References

External links 
 

NPR programs
Audio podcasts
Music podcasts
2005 podcast debuts
2000 radio programme debuts
American podcasts